Miles Field may refer to:

 Miles Field (Oregon), a baseball park from 1948 to 2004 in Medford, Oregon 
 Miles Field (Virginia Tech), an outdoor athletics venue of Virginia Agricultural and Mechanical College and Polytechnic Institute dating to 1894

See also
 Miles Stadium, a former football stadium at Virginia Agricultural and Mechanical College from 1926 to 1964